The Turing scheme is a student exchange programme established by the United Kingdom Department for Education in 2021 as a replacement for the European Union Erasmus Programme following Brexit.

History

Choice of name

The Erasmus programme was named after the Dutch scholar Erasmus, whereas the new programme was named after Alan Turing the English mathematician, computer scientist, logician, cryptanalyst, philosopher, and theoretical biologist. Turing was highly influential in the development of theoretical computer science, providing a formalisation of the concepts of algorithm and computation with the Turing machine, which can be considered a model of a general-purpose computer. Turing is widely considered to be the father of theoretical computer science and artificial intelligence. Despite these accomplishments, he was never fully recognised in his home country during his lifetime due to the prevalence of homophobia at the time and because much of his work was covered by the Official Secrets Act.

The 2020 proposal
In December 2020, following the announcement of a trade deal with the EU and the decision to no longer participate in the EU's Erasmus Programme which has seen over 200,000 UK students benefit from the scheme since 1987, the British government announced the funding of £100m a year to enable up to 35,000 UK students, especially those from deprived backgrounds, to study abroad at some of the best universities in the world, not just limited to EU universities, or undertake work placements, starting in September 2021. 

Michel Barnier, the EU's chief negotiator, expressed regret at the UK's decision not to participate in Erasmus, a decision Boris Johnson said had been hard to take, but the UK could not justify in staying in the 'extremely expensive' Erasmus+ scheme that saw twice as many EU students coming to the UK compared to UK students going to university elsewhere in the EU.

Operation
From 2014 to 2020, the British Council and Ecorys UK jointly administered the Erasmus programme.
Initially the Turing Scheme was administered by the same organisations. They launched the Turing Scheme website in February 2021.

The Turing scheme set out to provide grants to students to help fund their international experience from September 2021. Successful applicants included primary schools in County Durham.

After a procurement exercise in 2021 the delivery of the Turing Scheme was awarded to Capita Business Services, who will deliver it until December 2023. The decision was made based on Capita’s bid coming in at a lower price than the British Council’s.

Countries participating in the Turing Scheme 
There are 159 Countries participating in the Turing Scheme from across the globe.

Universities participating in the Turing Scheme

References

External links
 Turing scheme website 

2021 establishments in the United Kingdom
Higher education in the United Kingdom
Academic transfer
Brexit replacement schemes
Alan Turing